Below are the squads for the Football at the 2019 Southeast Asian Games - men's tournament, hosted by the Philippines, which took place from 25 November to 10 December 2019.

The men's tournament will be an under-22 international tournament (born on or after 1 January 1997), with a maximum of two overage players allowed. Each participating nation's squad are to be composed of maximum of 20 players.

Group A

Philippines 
Head coach:  Goran Milojević

Malaysia 
Head coach:  Ong Kim Swee

Myanmar 
Head coach:  Velizar Popov

Cambodia 
Head coach:  Félix Dalmás

Timor-Leste 
Head coach:  Fabiano Flora

Group B

Thailand 
Head coach:  Akira Nishino

Indonesia 
Head coach:  Indra Sjafri

Vietnam 
Head coach:  Park Hang-seo

Laos 
Head coach:  V. Sundramoorthy

Singapore 
Head coach:  Fandi Ahmad

Brunei 
Head coach:  Aminuddin Jumat

References

Men's team squads